Lee Wan-koo (16 July 1950 – 14 October 2021) was a South Korean politician who briefly served as Prime Minister in 2015.

Biography 
After graduating from Sungkyunkwan University, Lee worked as a public officer in the Economic Planning Board (current Ministry of Strategy and Finance) and later moved to the National Police Agency. From 1982 to 1984, he studied at Michigan State University in the United States and received an M. A. in Criminal Justice. From 1986 to 1989, Lee served as Consul for the Consulate General of the Republic of Korea in Los Angeles.

In 1995, Lee entered into politics, joining the Democratic Liberal Party (later renamed as the New Korea Party). In the 1996 election, he was elected as a member of the National Assembly for the New Korea Party. In 1998, he joined the United Liberal Democrats, led by Kim Jong-pil. In the 2006 election, he was elected as the governor of South Chungcheong Province. He resigned as governor on 23 December 2009, as a protest against the Lee Myung-bak government.

Lee was diagnosed with multiple myeloma, a type of blood cancer. After recovering, he was re-elected as a member of the National Assembly in a 2013 by-election. In May 2014, he became the floor leader of the ruling Saenuri Party.

Prime Minister of South Korea
On 23 January 2015, President Park Geun-hye named Lee, at the time parliamentary floor leader, as prime minister. Lee was confirmed by the National Assembly as Prime Minister on 16 February 2015; the National Assembly voted with 148 Yes, 128 No, with 5 Abstained.

On 20 April 2015, Lee offered to resign as Prime Minister, amid allegations of bribery. He formally stepped down on 27 April 2015, apologizing over a scandal in which he was accused of taking an illegal cash gift from Sung Wan-jong, a businessman. President Park Geun-hye accepted Lee's resignation.

Conviction
In January 2016, he was convicted of taking illegal funds by the Seoul Central District Court. However, in September 2016, he was acquitted by the Seoul High Court. On 2017, the Supreme Court upheld the Seoul High Court's acquittal of Lee.

Death
In 2016, Lee's cancer returned. He died on 14 October 2021, due to multiple myeloma, at the age of 71. He died about two weeks before former President Roh Tae Woo died on October 26, 2021.

References

1950 births
2021 deaths
20th-century South Korean politicians
21st-century South Korean politicians
Deaths from multiple myeloma
Government ministers of South Korea
Members of the National Assembly (South Korea)
People from South Chungcheong Province
Prime Ministers of South Korea
Governors of South Chungcheong Province
Sungkyunkwan University alumni
United Liberal Democrats politicians
Michigan State University alumni
Dankook University alumni